Taswell may refer to:
 Taswell (yacht), a brand of sailboat
 Taswell, Indiana, an unincorporated community in Indiana, United States
 "Taswell", by C418 from Minecraft - Volume Beta, 2013